The second generation is the generation following the one preceding it.

Second generation, Generation II, or variants may also refer to:

 Second generation immigrant
 Nisei, one of the second generation of people of Japanese descent in the Americas
 Second generation of Chinese leaders, see Generations of Chinese leadership
 Second-generation human rights, see Three generations of human rights
 People whose parents took part in a Blessing ceremony of the Unification Church

Arts and entertainment 
 Second Generation (novel), 1964 novel, by Raymond Williams
 Second Generation, 1978 novel by Howard Fast
 The Second Generation, 1994 collection of five fantasy novellas by Margaret Weis and Tracy Hickman
 Second Generation (film), 2003 British television drama
 Second Generation (advertisement), 2006 television ad for Nike
 Second Generation of Postwar Writers in Japanese literature
 Second Generation (2003), a British TV serial that was aired in 2003
 Transformers: Generation 2, toy line which ran from 1992–1995
 In Pokémon, see List of generation II Pokémon

Science and technology 
 2G, second-generation wireless telephone technology
 Second generation computer, a computer constructed using discrete transistors
 Second generation of video game consoles (1976–1984), sometimes referred to as the early 8-bit era
 Second Generation Multiplex Plus, DNA profiling system
 Second-generation programming language, a generational way to categorise assembly languages
 Second-generation warfare, the tactics of warfare used after the invention of the rifled musket and breech-loading weapons
 Second-generation wavelet transform, in signal processing
 Transperth Second Generation A-series train; see Transperth A-series train
 Generation II reactor, a category of nuclear power reactor that includes many of those still in operation
 EPC Gen2, a standard for Radio-frequency identification

Sport 
 List of second-generation Major League Baseball players
 List of second-generation National Basketball Association players
 List of second-generation National Football League players

See also 
 Generation (disambiguation)
 First generation (disambiguation)
 Third generation (disambiguation)